1Life Healthcare, Inc. (doing business as One Medical) is a San Francisco-based chain of primary healthcare clinics. One Medical is a membership-based primary care service with in-person care and online resources, including a mobile app. In February 2023, it was acquired by Amazon.

History

One Medical was founded by Tom Lee in 2007. The company grew from a single San Francisco clinic to more than 72 locations across the United States, including 29 clinics in the greater San Francisco Bay Area. 1Life Healthcare, Inc. serves as an administrative and managerial services company for physican-owned professional corporations (PCs).

In 2017, Amir Rubin succeeded Tom Lee as CEO of One Medical. In 2018, The Carlyle Group invested $350 million in the company. One Medical is also backed by Google's parent company Alphabet Inc.

On January 31, 2020, One Medical began trading on the Nasdaq stock exchange.

During the early stages of vaccine distribution, One Medical was accused of administering the COVID-19 vaccine to ineligible patients in several states. This resulted in a congressional investigation. The Congressional investigation concluded that One Medical sought to use its access to COVID vaccines for financial gain, by pushing those looking for vaccines towards its own paid memberships, and that it provided early access vaccines to those with insider connections at the company.

In September 2021, One Medical acquired Iora Health.

Acquisition by Amazon 
In July 2022, it was announced that Amazon, Inc. agreed to acquire One Medical for about $3.9 billion in an all-cash deal. Prior to the announcement, pharmacy chain CVS Health had also bid for the company. Amazon formally acquired One Medical on February 22, 2023.

Reaction 
Following news of the acquisition, several commentators and public advocacy groups expressed concern that the deal would harm patient privacy. U.S. Senator Josh Hawley, a Republican from Missouri, urged the Federal Trade Commission (FTC) to scrutinize the deal.

Oregon's health agency, the Oregon Health Authority (OHA), was empowered to assess the deal as there were five One Medical clinics operating in the state as of 2022. In December 2022, the OHA ultimately concluded in its preliminary review of the acquisition that the acquisition would not lead to a substantial reduction in affordable healthcare in the state. As such, the OHA approved the acquisition.

Antitrust scrutiny 
Following the announcement of the acquisition, observers speculated that the deal may face antitrust scrutiny. In September 2022, a SEC filing by 1Life Healthcare revealed that the FTC had begun a probe into the deal.

On February 21, 2023, the FTC ultimately declined to challenge the deal with an antitrust lawsuit before the acquisition was completed. The acquisition was officially completed the next day, on February 22, 2023. The FTC clarified that it is still investigating the merger and may still choose to challenge the acquisition.

References

External links

2007 establishments in California
General practice organizations
Primary care
American companies established in 2007
Health care companies established in 2007
Health care companies based in California
Companies based in San Francisco
Companies formerly listed on the Nasdaq
2020 initial public offerings
2023 mergers and acquisitions
Amazon (company) acquisitions